This is a list of supermarket chains in Luxembourg (by alphabetical order and with the country of origin):

Aldi 
 Alima 
Auchan 
Cactus 
Carrefour 
Colruyt 
Cora 
Delhaize 
Grand Frais 
Lidl  
Match 
Monoprix 
Naturalia 
 Naturata 
 Pall Center 
 Primavera 
 Proxy 
REWE  
 Smatch 

Supermarket
Luxembourg